Lin Te-fu (born 23 October 1953) is a Taiwanese politician. He is a member of the Legislative Yuan for the Chinese Nationalist Party since 2002. He represents the Ninth New Taipei City Constituency.

References 

1953 births
Living people
Members of the 5th Legislative Yuan
Members of the 6th Legislative Yuan
Members of the 7th Legislative Yuan
Members of the 8th Legislative Yuan
Members of the 9th Legislative Yuan
Members of the 10th Legislative Yuan
21st-century Taiwanese politicians
Kuomintang Members of the Legislative Yuan in Taiwan
National Chengchi University alumni
New Taipei Members of the Legislative Yuan